Discovery at Dawn is a 2012 Italian drama film co-written and directed by Susanna Nicchiarelli. It is loosely based on the novel La scoperta dell'alba by Walter Veltroni.

The film premiered at the 2012 Rome International Film Festival.

Plot 
Thirty years after the disappearance of her father, a woman discovers she can make phone calls to her past self.

Cast 
Margherita Buy as Caterina Astengo
Susanna Nicchiarelli as Barbara Astengo
Sergio Rubini as Lorenzo
Lino Guanciale as Marco Tessandori
Renato Carpentieri as Giovanni Tonini
Lina Sastri as Marianna Dall'Acqua

See also
 List of Italian films of 2012

References

External links

2012 drama films
2012 films
Italian drama films 
Films based on Italian novels
Films directed by Susanna Nicchiarelli
2010s Italian-language films
2010s Italian films